PantyChrist is a live album by Bob Ostertag, released on May 18, 1999 by Seeland Records.

Reception

Tom Schulte of AllMusic gave the album three out of five possible stars, saying "At their most wrong, PantyChrist mixes the simple, bright melodies of childhood with the obscenely suggestive notions of an unleashed pervert."

Track listing

Personnel
Adapted from the PantyChrist liner notes.

Musicians
 Justin Vivian Bond – vocals
 Trevor Dunn – bass guitar
 Uchihashi Kazuhisa – guitar
 Mizuhiro (as Animo Computer) – synthesizer
 Bob Ostertag – sampler, arrangements, mixing
 Richard Rogers – keyboards
 Jon Rose – violin, additional vocals
 Otomo Yoshihide – electronics, turntables

Production and design
 Heide Foley – design
 Michael Mott – cover art, illustrations
 Daniel Nicolletta – photography

Release history

References

External links 
 PantyChrist at Bandcamp
 PantyChrist at Discogs (list of releases)

1999 live albums
Bob Ostertag albums
Seeland Records live albums